The Pueblo Chemical Agent-Destruction Pilot Plant (PCAPP) is a chemical weapons destruction facility built to destroy the chemical weapons stockpile stored at the U.S. Army Pueblo Chemical Depot (PCD), in southeastern Colorado. The depot contains munitions that are part of the U.S. national chemical weapons stockpile. Before chemical weapons destruction began at PCAPP, these munitions contained 2,613 U.S. tons of mustard agent. The weapons have been stored at the  depot since the 1950s.

The stockpile of chemical weapons originally stored at PCD consists of 155mm projectiles, 105mm projectiles and 4.2-inch mortar rounds. PCAPP is using neutralization followed by biotreatment to destroy the remaining stockpile in the main plant and Static Detonation Chamber technology to augment the main plant.

Destruction of this stockpile is a requirement of the Chemical Weapons Convention, an international treaty to which the United States is a party. The Organisation for the Prohibition of Chemical Weapons is the implementing body of the Chemical Weapons Convention and monitors the progress of the nation's chemical weapons destruction programs.

The Program Executive Office, Assembled Chemical Weapons Alternatives (PEO ACWA) oversees the destruction of the Pueblo chemical weapons stockpile.

Bechtel Pueblo Team (BPT; consisting of Bechtel National, Inc., Amentum, Battelle Memorial Institute and GP Strategies) will design, construct, pilot test, operate and close PCAPP.

Planning of activities
Destruction began in 2016 and the plant will operate until all the chemical weapons have been destroyed and closure activities (shut-down, dismantling, and restoration of site) have been completed. Elimination of chemical weapons/agent is slated for 2023.

In 2010, the Pueblo Chemical Depot, in conjunction with the ACWA program, completed an environmental assessment (EA) to meet the requirements of the National Environmental Policy Act, or NEPA, and Title 32 Code of Federal Regulations Part 651 regarding the construction and operation of the U.S. Army’s Explosive Destruction System (EDS) and/or other explosive destruction technologies (EDT), at the U.S. Army Pueblo Chemical Depot in Colorado. The EA was withdrawn and a new EA was completed in 2012. The new EA focused on the use of EDT for destroying overpacked and reject munitions. In April 2013, Program Executive Officer Conrad F. Whyne announced his selection of EDS to augment the Pueblo Chemical Agent-Destruction Pilot Plant for the safe destruction of chemical munitions unsuited for processing by the main plant’s automated equipment. In spring 2018, the decision was made to end EDS and utilize three Static Detonation Chamber units to augment the main plant. Site preparations began in June 2019 with assembly of the SDC units completed in June 2020. The SDC complex began destroying 4.2-inch mortar rounds on Feb. 19, 2022.

History of chemical demilitarization in Colorado

Technology
The Department of Defense conducted studies to evaluate potential impacts of the elimination of these weapons using incineration and non-incineration methods. Four technologies were considered: 
 incineration 
 chemical neutralization followed by supercritical water oxidation 
 chemical neutralization followed by supercritical water oxidation and gas phase chemical reduction
 electrochemical oxidation
Neutralization followed by biotreatment was selected for the destruction of the Colorado stockpile.

The technology comprises the following steps:
 Robotic equipment removes energetics (explosives) from the weapon, including the fuze and the burster. The energetics are disposed of at a permitted facility off site. 
 The inside of the weapon is remotely accessed and mustard agent is washed out with high-pressure water. 
 The mustard agent is mixed with hot water. The resulting mixture is neutralized with a caustic solution. The byproduct is called hydrolysate. The hydrolysate is treated biologically.
 The water is recovered for reuse in the destruction process and the excess activated sludge is secured in containers for disposal at an off-site permitted facility. 

Explosive Destruction Technology (EDT)
After an assessment of problem munitions showed that their destruction would be difficult using neutralization and biotreatment, ACWA decided to explore use of Explosive Destruction Technology (aka Explosive Demolition Technology, Explosive Detonation Technology, EDT) for these projectiles.

EDT uses heat and pressure from explosion or just heat to destroy the munitions; it is not considered incineration and does not require disassembly of the weapons. There are three general types of technologies that can destroy chemical weapons:
 Detonation technology – destroys the majority of the agent and explosive in the munition by detonating donor explosives wrapped around the munition. The resulting off-gasses are processed through secondary treatment to ensure agent destruction. Examples of detonation technology include the Transportable Detonation Chamber, or TDC, and the DAVINCH (Detonation of Ammunition in a Vacuum-Integrated Chamber).
 Neutralization technology – uses small explosive shaped charges to open the munition and consume the explosive in the burster and fuze. The agent is destroyed by subsequent neutralization. The U.S. Army’s EDS, is an example. 
 Thermal destruction – uses the heat of the electrically heated containment vessel to deflagrate the munition and destroy the agent and energetics. The resulting gases are treated in an off-gas treatment system. The Static Detonation Chamber, or SDC, is an example of thermal destruction technology.

In April 2013, Program Executive Officer Conrad F. Whyne announced his selection of the U.S. Army’s EDS to augment the PCAPP for the safe destruction of chemical munitions unsuited for processing by the main plant’s automated equipment.

The PCAPP EDS started processing on March 18 with the elimination of Department of Transportation (DOT) bottles which contain chemical agent drained from selected munitions over the years to assess the condition of the stockpile. On April 8, the first munitions were successfully processed. In June, operators at the PCAPP EDS took things up a notch with the introduction of 4.2-inch mortars into the destruction process. The first three mortars were joined by three 105 mm projectiles. All were safely detonated in the vessel on June 18. On July 16, the first 155 mm projectiles from Pueblo’s stockpile were safely destroyed in the PCAPP EDS. The PCAPP EDS completed its first campaign in February 2016, destroying 549 munitions that leaked or were sampled in the past and 11 bottles containing mustard agent. The second and final campaign ran from June 25 to Dec. 5, 2018.

Static Detonation Chamber (SDC) 
In spring 2018, PCAPP announced a proposal to procure three Static Detonation Chambers (SDC).

Due to performance issues identified during the first year of pilot testing, and in order to complete destruction of the stockpile by 2023, this technology was chosen to augment the main plant under a proposal by the ACWA program. To meet the requirements of the National Environmental Policy Act and federal regulations, an Environmental Assessment was conducted. A Finding of No Significant Impact resulted from the assessment.

Preparations at the SDC site began in June 2019. The first Static Detonation Chamber components arrived at the depot on Aug. 6, 2019, in a convoy of more than a dozen flatbed trucks. Assembly began Oct. 31, 2019. Protective, tension fabric coverings were erected around each unit, with construction beginning in September 2019. They were completed in June 2020.

On Feb. 19, 2022, chemical-agent destruction began at the Pueblo SDC complex with the processing of a portion of the of 4.2-inch mortar rounds. SDC operations marked the beginning of the third and final chemical weapons destruction campaign at PCAPP.

Public outreach 
The Pueblo Chemical Stockpile Outreach Office was established in 1997 to serve as the community’s primary information resource on chemical weapons destruction in Colorado. The office responds to inquiries, provides information materials and coordinates guest speakers for a variety of different civic groups and organizations and interfaces with the governor-appointed Colorado Chemical Demilitarization Citizens’ Advisory Commission.

See also
 Pueblo Chemical Depot
 Pueblo Depot Activity
 Blue Grass Chemical Agent-Destruction Pilot Plant

References

External links 

 Centers for Disease Control – Chemical Demilitarization
 Chemical Stockpile Emergency Preparedness Program
 
 
 U.S. Army Chemical Materials Activity

United States chemical weapons depots
United States Army arsenals
Military installations in Colorado
Buildings and structures in Pueblo County, Colorado
2015 establishments in Colorado